Rake It In: The Greatestest Hits is a greatest hits album by the punk rock supergroup Me First and the Gimme Gimmes. It was released on April 7, 2017, on Fat Wreck Chords. The album has songs from throughout their career, from their first release, the "Denver" 7" in 1995, to their last, Are We Not Men? We Are Diva! in 2014.

In March 2017, the band released a track from the album, "City of New Orleans", which had previously only been available on vinyl.

Track listing

Track origins 
 Track 1 originally appeared on Turn Japanese EP (2001) and on Bob 7" (2001)
 Tracks 2, 4 and 7 originally appeared on Are a Drag (1999)
 Track 3 originally appeared on Willie 7" (2007)
 Tracks 5, 9 and 15 originally appeared on Blow in the Wind (2001)
 Track 6 originally appeared on Are We Not Men? We Are Diva! (2014)
 Track 8 originally appeared on Denver 7" (1995) and later Have Another Ball (2008)
 Tracks 10 and 13 originally appeared on Love Their Country (2006)
 Track 11 originally appeared on Billy 7" (1996) and later Have a Ball (1997)
 Track 12 originally appeared on Shannon 7" (2001)
 Track 14 originally appeared on Kenny 7" (2008)
 Tracks 16 and 17 originally appeared on Take a Break (2003)

Personnel
 Spike Slawson – vocals
 Chris Shiflett (a.k.a. Jake Jackson) – lead guitar
 Joey Cape – rhythm guitar
 Fat Mike – bass guitar
 Dave Raun – drums

References

Me First and the Gimme Gimmes albums
2017 greatest hits albums
Fat Wreck Chords albums
Albums produced by Ryan Greene